Brian Smith (born September 16, 1983) is a former American football defensive end. He was drafted by the Jacksonville Jaguars in the fourth round of the 2007 NFL Draft. He played college football at Missouri.

Early years
Brian Smith graduated from Billy Ryan High School in Denton, Texas in 2002. He was named Defensive Player of the Year as a junior and senior. He was a two-time All-State selection and led the team to the state championship in 2001 under head coach Joey Florence. Smith recorded 160 tackles and 35 sacks as a senior. He posted 20 sacks as a junior.

College career
Smith played his collegiate ball at the University of Missouri.  Starting as a situational pass-rusher, by his junior year he had blossomed into the team's best defensive end.  Although he was injured midway through his senior season, Smith finished his collegiate career as Missouri's all-time leader in sacks.

NFL career
Smith was drafted in the 4th round on the 2007 NFL Draft by the Jacksonville Jaguars. He was placed on the PUP list during this rookie year. He was waived in June 2008, never playing a down for the Jaguars.

References

External links
Jacksonville Jaguars bio
Missouri Tigers bio

1983 births
Living people
American football defensive ends
American football linebackers
Jacksonville Jaguars players
Missouri Tigers football players
Players of American football from Texas
Sportspeople from Denton, Texas